Rizhskaya is a railway station on the Leningradskaya line of Oktyabrskaya Railway and prospective Line D3 of the Moscow Central Diameters in Moscow. According to the current plans, the station will be rebuilt.

Gallery

References

Railway stations in Moscow
Railway stations of Oktyabrskaya Railway